Augsburg Haunstetterstraße station is a station south of central Augsburg in the German state of Bavaria.  It lies on a railway bridge over Haunstetter Straße, formerly written "Haunstetterstraße", and extends west to the Hochfeld bridge, which has been directly accessible via a staircase from the platform since December 2009. It is classified by Deutsche Bahn as a category 3 station. The station has been considerably remodelled in recent years as part of the upgrading of the Munich–Augsburg railway to have four tracks and is now mainly used to transfer between regional trains and tram lines 2, 3 and special event tram lines 8 and 9.

Regional services
Augsburg Haunstetterstraße station is served by almost all Regionalbahn  and Regional-Express services operated from Augsburg Central Station (Hauptbahnhof) towards Augsburg-Hochzoll and then Aichach to Ingolstadt or to Mering and Munich. All services of the Bayerische Regiobahn (BRB) towards Geltendorf or Weilheim also stop here. Trains to Friedberg, Aichach and Ingolstadt, which have also been served by the BRB since the timetable change of 13 December 2009, stop at the station at 15, 30 or 60 minute intervals depending on the destination. Taking all services together, the Augsburg "trunk line" between Augsburg-Hochzoll, Augsburg Haunstetterstraße, Augsburg Central Station and Augsburg-Oberhausen is served at 7.5-minute intervals during the peak, providing a regional train service close in quality to the proposed Augsburg S-Bahn service.

The station is not served by long distance services (Intercity-Express and Intercity trains). On 1 January 2009, Haunstetterstraße station was classified as a category 4 station. It was reclassified on 1 January 2011 as a category 3 station. Since then the station has been served regularly and it has developed as a major inner-city interchange station along with the Central Station and Hochzoll and Oberhausen stations. This eliminated difficult detours through the city centre to the Central Station for commuters from the southern districts of Augsburg.

Local services

Under the railway bridge there is a tram stop called Haunstetter Str./FH for regular tram lines 2 and 3 and special event tram lines 8 (to SGL arena) and 9 (Messe Augsburg, the Augsburg exhibition centre). It gives passengers short transfer distances and it is protected from the weather. Since its revamp in 2008 there are also lifts from the tram stop to both platforms. In addition, a staircase was built from the southern platform to Hochfeldstraße.

Notes

Haunstetterstrasse
Railway stations in Germany opened in 1939